The 1970 Masters Tournament was the 34th Masters Tournament, held April 9–13 at Augusta National Golf Club in Augusta, Georgia. A field of 83 players started the tournament and 48 made the 36-hole cut at 150 (+6).

Billy Casper defeated Gene Littler 69 to 74 in an 18-hole playoff on Monday to win his third major championship. It was the last 18-hole playoff at the Masters; the format was changed to sudden-death in 1976 and first used in 1979. To get into the playoff, Casper scored a final round of 71 (−1), while Littler shot a 70 to tie at 279 (−9).

Jack Nicklaus shot 69-69 on the weekend, but was hampered by a second round 75 and finished in 8th place. It was the final Masters tournament as a player for 1938 champion Henry Picard, who withdrew without finishing the first round. Three-time Masters champion Sam Snead finished in a tie for 23rd place at the age of 57. It was the Masters debut of two-time champion Tom Watson, then a 20-year-old amateur from Stanford who shot 77-76 and missed the cut by three strokes.

Harold Henning won the eleventh Par 3 contest on Wednesday with a score of 21.

Dick Schaap's The Masters: The Winning of a Golf Classic covered in detail the 1970 tournament.

Field
1. Masters champions
George Archer (8,9), Gay Brewer, Jack Burke Jr. (8), Doug Ford, Bob Goalby, Ralph Guldahl, Herman Keiser, Cary Middlecoff, Jack Nicklaus (2,3,8,11), Arnold Palmer (9), Henry Picard, Gary Player (2.3,10), Gene Sarazen, Sam Snead, Art Wall Jr.
Jimmy Demaret, Ben Hogan, Claude Harmon, and Byron Nelson did not play.

The following categories only apply to Americans

2. U.S. Open champions (last five years)
Billy Casper (8,11), Orville Moody (9,10)

Lee Trevino (8,11) did not play.

3. The Open champions (last five years)

4. PGA champions (last five years)
Julius Boros (9), Raymond Floyd (9,10,11), Al Geiberger (8,9), Don January (8), Dave Marr (9)

5. The first eight finishers in the 1969 U.S. Amateur
Charles Coe (a), Vinny Giles (7,a), John Farquhar (a), Steve Melnyk (6,7,a), Allen Miller (7,a), Ed Updegraff (7,a), Tom Watson (a), Bob Zender (a)

6. Previous two U.S. Amateur and Amateur champions

Bruce Fleisher (7) forfeited his exemption by turning professional.

7. Members of the 1969 U.S. Walker Cup team
John Bohmann (a), Bill Hyndman (a), Joe Inman (a), Dick Siderowf (a), Lanny Wadkins (a)

8. Top 24 players and ties from the 1969 Masters Tournament
Tommy Aaron (11), Miller Barber (9,10,11), Frank Beard (11), Deane Beman (9), Charles Coody (9,10), Dale Douglass (9,11), Lionel Hebert, Dave Hill (9,11), Gene Littler (11), Mason Rudolph, Dan Sikes (11), Dave Stockton, Tom Weiskopf, Bert Yancey

9. Top 16 players and ties from the 1969 U.S. Open
Bunky Henry, Howie Johnson, Bob Murphy, Dean Refram, Phil Rodgers, Bob Rosburg, Kermit Zarley

10. Top eight players and ties from 1969 PGA Championship
Bert Greene, Terry Wilcox, Jimmy Wright, Larry Ziegler

11. Members of the U.S. 1969 Ryder Cup team
Ken Still

12. One player, either amateur or professional, not already qualified, selected by a ballot of ex-Masters champions.
Bob Lunn

13. Leading six players, not already qualified, from a points list based on finishes in PGA Tour events since the previous Masters
Homero Blancas, Larry Hinson, Grier Jones, Dick Lotz, Chi-Chi Rodríguez, R. H. Sikes

14. Foreign invitations
Maurice Bembridge, Roberto Bernardini, Michael Bonallack (6,a), Peter Butler, Bob Charles, Bruce Crampton (8,9), Roberto De Vicenzo (3), Bruce Devlin (8,9), Bernard Gallacher, Harold Henning (8), Hsieh Yung-yo, Tony Jacklin (3), George Knudson (8), Takaaki Kono (8), Sukree Onsham

Numbers in brackets indicate categories that the player would have qualified under had they been American.

Round summaries

First round
Thursday, April 8, 1970

Source:

Second round
Friday, April 10, 1970

Source:

Third round
Saturday, April 11, 1970

Source:

Final round
Sunday, April 12, 1970

Final leaderboard

Sources:

Scorecard

Cumulative tournament scores, relative to par

Playoff 
Monday, April 13, 1970

Source:

Scorecard

Source:

References

External links
Masters.com – past winners and results
Augusta.com – 1970 Masters leaderboard and scorecards

1970
1970 in golf
1970 in American sports
1970 in sports in Georgia (U.S. state)
April 1970 sports events in the United States